Thalictrum kiusianum, the Kyushu meadow-rue or dwarf meadow-rue, is a herbaceous perennial grown for its compact slowly spreading habit, forming a mat of dark green, with showy purplish-pink flowers.

References

External links
 
 
 Fine Gardening
 Kew Plant List
 IPNI Listing

kiusanum
Taxa named by Takenoshin Nakai